Michael James Bickle FRS is a British geologist, and professor in the Department of Earth Sciences at the University of Cambridge.
He won a 2003 Coke Medal, from the Geological Society.

His research combines field research projects, and physical modelling,
including carbon capture and storage.

References

British geophysicists
Academics of the University of Cambridge
Fellows of the Royal Society
Living people
Alumni of Queens' College, Cambridge
Alumni of the University of Oxford
1948 births